Peter Wirth may refer to:

 James Wirth (Peter Wirth, 1830–1871), German Catholic Religious Brother
 Peter Wirth (politician) (born 1961), member of the New Mexico Senate